Moshiri is a surname. Notable people with the surname include:

 Farhad Moshiri (born 1955), British-Iranian businessman
 Farhad Moshiri (artist) (born 1963), Iranian artist
 Farnoosh Moshiri, Iranian novelist, playwright, and librettist
 Fereydoon Moshiri (1926–2000), Iranian poet
 Mahshid Moshiri, Iranian novelist and lexicographer. 
 Maryam Moshiri, British television broadcaster
 Minoo Moshiri, Iranian essayist, literary translator, film-critic and journalist
 Syed Rahim Moshiri (born 1930), Iranian geographer

See also
 Moshiri Station, train station in Japan